Wilson Wood (born Charles Woodrow Tolkien, February 11, 1915 – October 23, 2004) was an American character actor during the middle of the twentieth century.

Born in Huron, North Dakota on February 11, 1915, he made his film debut with a small role in 1946's Two Sisters from Boston, directed by Henry Koster. During his 17-year career he would appear in over 100 films, usually in smaller roles. In 1952 he would star in a serial for Republic Pictures.  The 12 part series was titled, Zombies of the Stratosphere, which would be edited down and released in 1958 as a feature film, called Satan's Satellites. His final appearance would be in the 1962 film, Jumbo, starring Doris Day, Stephen Boyd and Jimmy Durante, in which Wood had a featured role. Wood died on October 23, 2004, in Culver City, California.

Filmography

(Per AFI database)

 Faithful in My Fashion  (1946)   	
 No Leave, No Love  (1946)   	
 The Show-Off  (1946)   	
 Two Sisters from Boston  (1946)   	
 High Tide  (1947) - Cleve Collins   	
 It Happened in Brooklyn  (1947)   	
 The Unfinished Dance  (1947)   	
 Big City  (1948)   	
 Campus Honeymoon  (1948)   	
 Easter Parade  (1948)   	
 The Luck of the Irish  (1948)   	
 State of the Union  (1948)   	
 Chicken Every Sunday  (1949)   	
 Command Decision  (1949)   	
 The Kissing Bandit  (1949)   	
 Adam's Rib  (1949)   	
 One Sunday Afternoon  (1949) - Courtney (uncredited)  	
 That Wonderful Urge  (1949)   	
 The Barkleys of Broadway  (1949) - Larry	
 The Doctor and the Girl  (1949)   	
 Scene of the Crime  (1949)   	
 The Sun Comes Up  (1949)   	
 That Forsyte Woman  (1949)   	
 That Midnight Kiss  (1949)   	
 East Side, West Side  (1950)   	
 The Asphalt Jungle  (1950)   	
 Dial 1119  (1950) - Television Man (uncredited)   	
 Duchess of Idaho  (1950)   	
 Kim  (1950) - Gerald (uncredited)
 I'll Get By  (1950)   	
 Key to the City  (1950)   	
 A Life of Her Own  (1950)   	
 My Blue Heaven  (1950)   	
 Nancy Goes to Rio  (1950)   	
 The Next Voice You Hear...  (1950)   	
 The Reformer and the Redhead  (1950)   	
 The Skipper Surprised His Wife  (1950)   	
 Stars in My Crown  (1950)   	
 Two Weeks with Love  (1950)   	
 The Yellow Cab Man  (1950)   	
 Young Man with a Horn  (1950)   	
 Watch the Birdie  (1951)   	   	
 Callaway Went Thataway  (1951)   	
 The Day the Earth Stood Still  (1951)   	
 The Desert Fox: The Story of Rommel  (1951) - Sergeant Major (uncredited)	
 Force of Arms  (1951)   	
 Insurance Investigator  (1951)   	
 Let's Make It Legal  (1951)   	
 Mr. Imperium  (1951)   	
 No Questions Asked  (1951) - Artist (uncredited)  	
 The Red Badge of Courage  (1951)   	
 Royal Wedding  (1951)   	
 Soldiers Three  (1951)   	
 The Strip  (1951)   	
 Texas Carnival  (1951)   	
 Thunder in God's Country  (1951)   	
 The Tall Target  (1951)   	
 The Magnificent Yankee  (1951)   	
 Because You're Mine  (1952)   	
 Deadline – U.S.A.  (1952)   	
 Everything I Have Is Yours  (1952)   	
 Fearless Fagan  (1952)   	
 The Girl in White  (1952)   	
 Invitation  (1952)   	
 Love Is Better Than Ever  (1952)   	
 Pat and Mike  (1952)   	
 The Pride of St. Louis  (1952)   	
 Red Skies of Montana  (1952)   	
 Singin' in the Rain  (1952)   	
 Skirts Ahoy!  (1952)   	
 Stars and Stripes Forever  (1952) 
 Washington Story  (1952) 
 Young Man with Ideas  (1952)
 The Bad and the Beautiful  (1952) - Man on Movie Set (uncredited)
 Easy to Love  (1953) - (uncredited)
 The Clown  (1953) - Wardrobe Man (uncredited)
 The Silver Whip  (1953) - Telegrapher (uncredited)
 Rogue's March  (1953) - Sentry (uncredited)
 I Love Melvin  (1953) - Look Magazine Board of Directors (uncredited)	
 The Girl Who Had Everything  (1953) - Newsman (uncredited)
 The Girl Next Door  (1953) - Photographer (uncredited)
 The President's Lady  (1953) - Bit Role (uncredited)
 Fast Company  (1953) - Photographer (uncredited)
 Pickup on South Street  (1953) - Police Driver (uncredited)
 The Band Wagon  (1953) - Can-Toss Booth Operator (uncredited)
 Ride, Vaquero!  (1953) - Orderly (uncredited)
 Half a Hero  (1953) - Co-Worker (uncredited)
 Take the High Ground!  (1953) - Marine Friend (uncredited)
 Give a Girl a Break  (1953) - Dog Trainer (uncredited)	
 The Long, Long Trailer  (1954) - Garage Owner (uncredited)
 Executive Suite  (1954) - Airport Clerk (uncredited)
 Prisoner of War  (1954) - Prisoner of War (uncredited)
 Black Widow  (1954) - Costume Designer (uncredited)	
 Athena  (1954) - Attendant (uncredited)	
 Hit the Deck  (1955) - Singer (uncredited)
 Moonfleet  (1955) - Soldier (uncredited)
 It's Always Fair Weather  (1955) - Roy - TV Director (uncredited)
 Trial  (1955) - Airline Boarding Checker (uncredited)
 The Tender Trap  (1955) - George - Elevator Boy (uncredited)
 Tea and Sympathy  (1956) - Alumnus (uncredited)
 The Opposite Sex  (1956) - Stage Manager (uncredited)
 Three Brave Men  (1956) - Messenger at Co-Op Meeting (uncredited)
 Designing Woman  (1957) - Reporter (uncredited)
 Jailhouse Rock  (1957) - Recording Engineer (uncredited)
 Don't Go Near the Water  (1957) - Yeoman (uncredited)	
 The High Cost of Loving  (1958) - Hastings - Man in Parking Lot (uncredited)
 Satan's Satellites  (1958) - Bob Wilson (archive footage)
 Some Came Running  (1959) - Reporter (uncredited)
 Ask Any Girl  (1959) - Detective (uncredited)
 North by Northwest  (1959) - Photographer at United Nations (uncredited)
 Please Don't Eat the Daisies  (1960) - Photographer (uncredited)
 Bells Are Ringing  (1960) - Party Guest (uncredited)	
 Cimarron  (1960) - Reporter (uncredited)
 Ada (1961) - Reporter (uncredited)
 Breakfast at Tiffany's  (1961) - Party Guest with Cat on Shoulder (uncredited)
 Jumbo  (1962) - Hank
 It Happened at the World's Fair  (1963) - Mechanic (uncredited)

References

External links
 
 

20th-century American male actors
American male film actors
Male actors from North Dakota
1915 births
2004 deaths